The 25th British Academy Scotland Awards were held on 15 November 2015 at the Radisson Blu Hotel in Glasgow, honouring the best Scottish film and television productions of 2015.  Presented by BAFTA Scotland, accolades are handed out for the best in feature-length film that were screened at British cinemas during 2015. The Nominees were announced on 13 October 2015. The ceremony was hosted by Edith Bowman.

Winners and Nominees

Winners are listed first and highlighted in boldface.

Outstanding Contribution to Film & Television
Bill Paterson

Outstanding Contribution to Craft
David Balfour

Outstanding Contribution to Broadcasting
Dorothy Byrne

See also
BAFTA Scotland
68th British Academy Film Awards
87th Academy Awards
21st Screen Actors Guild Awards
35th Golden Raspberry Awards

References

External links
BAFTA Scotland Home page

2015
2015 in British cinema
British Academy Scotland Awards
British Academy Scotland Awards
2015 in Scotland
2015 in British television
Brit
November 2015 events in the United Kingdom
2010s in Glasgow